Rand  may refer to:

Money and business
South African rand, the nation's unit of currency
Krugerrand, South African gold coin
Reasonable and non-discriminatory licensing, type of licensing used in the context of standardisation processes
Rand formula, formula in Canadian labour law
Randlord, term used to denote the entrepreneurs who controlled the diamond and gold mining industries in South Africa in its pioneer phase
Sperry Rand, an American technology company

Places
Rand, New South Wales, small town in Australia
Rand, Lincolnshire, small village in Lincolnshire, England
Brussels Periphery (Flemish territory around the city called Rand rond Brussel in Dutch, commonly shortened to de Rand)

South Africa
Witwatersrand, escarpment running through Gauteng region, South Africa; commonly shortened to the Rand (die Rand in Afrikaans), and associated urban area (Greater Johannesburg)
East Rand, urban eastern part of the Witwatersrand
West Rand, urban western part of the Witwatersrand
Randburg, area in Gauteng province
Midrand, area in Gauteng province
Randfontein, a town in Gauteng province

United States 
Randsburg, California
Rand, Colorado, an unincorporated community in Jackson County, Colorado
Rand, Texas, an unincorporated community in Kaufman County, Texas
Rand, West Virginia, a census-designated place in Kanawha County, West Virginia

People
Rand (given name)
Rand (surname)
Ayn Rand, Russian-American novelist and philosopher
Rand Paul, American politician and physician.
Rand (Robotech), character from the fictional Third Robotech War
Rand al'Thor, main protagonist in The Wheel of Time series by Robert Jordan
Paul Rand, American art director and graphic designer

Organizations
RAND Corporation, an American think tank
Ayn Rand Institute, an American think tank
Rand Refinery, the world's largest gold refinery
Remington Rand, American computer firm and general manufacturer
Ingersoll-Rand, diversified American industrial firm
Rand McNally, American map publisher and printer
Sperry Rand, American equipment and electronics company
Rand Club, the oldest members club in Johannesburg
Rand Afrikaans University, a defunct university that is now part of the University of Johannesburg

Science and technology
rand, any of a number of pseudorandom number generator functions in various programming languages
Rand index, technique for measuring the similarity between two data clusters
R Andromedae (R And), a variable star
Rand Airport, an airport near Johannesburg